Cavolinia is a genus of gastropods belonging to the family Cavoliniidae.

The genus has cosmopolitan distribution.

Species:

Cavolina pycna 
Cavolina regulae 
Cavolinia baniensis 
Cavolinia bituminata 
Cavolinia cookei 
Cavolinia floridana 
Cavolinia gatti 
Cavolinia gibboides 
Cavolinia gibbosa 
Cavolinia globosa 
Cavolinia globulosa 
Cavolinia grandis 
Cavolinia gypsorum 
Cavolinia inflexa 
Cavolinia labiata 
Cavolinia landaui 
Cavolinia longicostata 
Cavolinia longirostratus 
Cavolinia marginata 
Cavolinia mexicana 
Cavolinia microbesitas 
Cavolinia moluccana 
Cavolinia occidentalis
Cavolinia pachysoma 
Cavolinia perparvula 
Cavolinia quadridentata
Cavolinia rewaensis 
Cavolinia shibatai 
Cavolinia toumeyi 
Cavolinia triaspis 
Cavolinia tridentata 
Cavolinia tridentata 
Cavolinia uncinata 
Cavolinia uncinata 
Cavolinia ventricosa 
Cavolinia xenica 
Cavolinia zamboninii

References

Cavoliniidae